Jim Wilson (born 15 December 1941) is a Northern Irish politician, who was an Ulster Unionist Party (UUP)  Member of the Northern Ireland Assembly  (MLA) for  South Antrim from 1998 to 2007.

Born in County Antrim, Wilson attended Belfast College of Technology before becoming a marine engineer. He was elected to Newtownabbey Borough Council in 1975 for the Vanguard Unionist Progressive Party, and joined the Ulster Unionist Party the following year.  However, he resigned his position on the council in 1988.  He was UUP General Secretary from the late 1980s until 1998.

Wilson was elected to the Northern Ireland Assembly for South Antrim in 1998 and held his seat at the 2003 election.  He retired from front line politics in 2007.  In March 2007 he was reappointed General Secretary of the UUP.

References

External links
Northern Ireland Assembly - Biography - Jim Wilson

1941 births
Living people
Northern Ireland MLAs 1998–2003
Northern Ireland MLAs 2003–2007
Members of Newtownabbey Borough Council
Politicians from County Antrim
Ulster Unionist Party MLAs
Vanguard Unionist Progressive Party politicians
People from Newtownabbey